The Men's 100 m wheelchair race B was one of the events held in Athletics at the 1968 Summer Paralympics in Tel Aviv.

There were 17 competitors in the heat; 6 made it into the final.

Australia's Kevin Munro achieved a time of 21.8 seconds, taking the gold medal.

Results

Heats

Final

References 

Wheelchair